Cândido Mendes may refer to:

Cândido Mendes de Almeida (1818–1881), Brazilian lawyer, journalist and politician
Cândido Mendes, Maranhão, a Brazilian municipality
Cândido Mendes University, a private university in Rio de Janeiro, Brazil